Royal Air Force Chetwynd or more simply RAF Chetwynd is a former Royal Air Force satellite station located in Chetwynd, Shropshire, England.

The following units were here at some point:
 No. 5 (Pilots) Advanced Flying Unit RAF
 No. 5 Service Flying Training School  RAF
 No. 6 Flying Training School RAF
 Central Flying School
 Shropshire Gliding Club

References

Royal Air Force stations in Shropshire